On 15 July 2015, the Irish Oireachtas passed the Gender Recognition Act 2015, which permits Irish citizens to change their gender on government documents through self-determination. The law does not require any medical intervention by the applicant nor an assessment by medical professionals. Such changes are possible through self-determination for any person aged 18 or over who is ordinarily resident in Ireland and/or registered on Irish registers of birth or adoption. Persons aged 16 to 18 years must secure a court order to exempt them from the normal requirement to be at least 18.

See also
 Gender Recognition Act 2004
 Gender Recognition Act (Norway)

References

External links
 Gender Recognition Act 2015, irishstatutebook.ie
 Review of the Gender Recognition Act 2015, assets.gov.ie

2015 in Irish law
Acts of the Oireachtas of the 2010s
Transgender law
LGBT law in Ireland
2015 in LGBT history